Róbert Jež (born 10 July 1981) is a retired Slovak footballer who played as midfielder.

Career

Club
Jež began playing football at his local club Nitra. He made his first team debut in the 1999–2000 season but next season he moved to Gambrinus liga club Viktoria Plzeň. He spent in Viktoria five seasons besides half-year loan for Marila Příbram in autumn 2004. In July 2005, he signed for Žilina where he won the Corgoň Liga title twice. He became a club captain after Zdeno Štrba's transfer to Skoda Xanthi in July 2009. He qualified with Žilina to the 2010–11 UEFA Champions League and played all 6 group games.

In February 2011, he joined Polish Ekstraklasa club Górnik Zabrze. After 14 matches and 5 goals for Górnik he signed a 3-year contract for Polonia Warsaw in June 2011.

On 28 June 2016, Jež has announced his retirement from football because of his persistent problems with his back.

Managerial career
On 3 June 2019, FK Pohronie announced on their Facebook page, that Jež would join the club as a sporting director, after the club's first historic promotion into Fortuna Liga. He only spent 4 months with the team before his release. Jež returned to Pohronie in February 2023 to serve as an assistant to Rastislav Urgela with the club competing in 2. Liga once more.

International
Róbert's international debut came in second half of the Slovakia vs. Croatia match on 16 October 2007. He scored his first international goal against Liechtenstein on 19 November 2008.

International goals

Honours

Žilina
Corgoň Liga (2): 2006–07, 2009–10
Slovak Super Cup (2): 2007, 2010

References

External links
 
 MŠK Žilina profile 
 

1981 births
Living people
Sportspeople from Nitra
Slovak footballers
Slovakia international footballers
Association football midfielders
FC Nitra players
FC Viktoria Plzeň players
1. FK Příbram players
MŠK Žilina players
Górnik Zabrze players
Polonia Warsaw players
Zagłębie Lubin players
FC Spartak Trnava players
Slovak Super Liga players
Czech First League players
Ekstraklasa players
Slovak expatriate footballers
Slovak expatriate sportspeople in the Czech Republic
Slovak expatriate sportspeople in Poland
Expatriate footballers in the Czech Republic
Expatriate footballers in Poland